Broadcasters for the San Diego Padres Major League Baseball team.

Play by Play
Jerry Gross (1969–1971)
Frank Sims (1969–1970)
Jerry Coleman (1972–1979, 1981–2013)
Ted Leitner (1980–2020)
Eddie Doucette (1980–1981)
Rick Monday (1989–1992)
Ken Levine (1995–1996)
Steve Physioc (1995)
Mel Proctor (1997–2001)
Glenn Geffner (1997–2002)
Matt Vasgersian (2002–2008)
Steve Quis (2006–2009)
Andy Masur (2007–2013)
Mark Neely (2009–2011)
Dick Enberg (2010–2016)
Mike Pomeranz (2012–present)
Jesse Agler (2014–present)
Don Orsillo (2016–present)

Analyst
Duke Snider (1969–1971)
Bob Chandler (1970–2003)
Dave Campbell (1978–1988)
Rick Monday (1989–1992)
Mark Grant (1996–present)
Rick Sutcliffe (1997–2004)
Tim Flannery (2005–2006)
Tony Gwynn (2005–2014)
Bob Scanlan (2012–present)
Mark Sweeney (2012–present)
Tony Gwynn Jr. (2017–present)

Spanish
Mario Thomas (1969–1997)
Arnoldo Sanchez Fontes (1969)
Gilberto Delgado Lizarraga (1971)
Gustavo Lopez Moreno (1969–1992)
Gustavo Lopez Estrada(1981–1991)
Eduardo Ortega (1987–present)
Juan Angel Avila (1998–2014)
Carlos Hernandez (2012–present)
Pedro Gutierrez (2014–present)
Matias Santos Martinez (1992-1997)
Rogelio Escobar Zaragoza
Jesus Rocha Barraza
Eduardo Valdez-Vizcarra
Rene Mora (1999–2002)
Homobono Briceño (2000–2002)

Broadcast Outlets

Over-the-air Television
KOGO-TV (1969–1970)
KCST(-TV) (1971–1972; 1984–1986)
XETV-TV (1977–1979)
KFMB-TV (1980–1983; 1995–1996)
KUSI-TV (1987–1994; 1997–2003)
KTTY (1995–1996)
XHBJ-TV (Spanish, 1991–1993)

There were no local over-the-air telecasts from 1973 to 1976.

Cable Television
Bally Sports San Diego (2021-present)
Fox Sports San Diego (2012–2020)
Cox Communications (1984–1989; 1991–1993; 1997–present)
Channel 4 San Diego (1997–2011)
Prime Ticket/Prime Sports West (1994–1996)

English Radio
KOGO (1969–1975; 1977–1978; 2000–2003)
KPGP (1976)
KFMB (1979–1999)
XEPRS-AM (2004–2016)
KBZT (2017)
KWFN (2018–present)

Spanish Radio
XEXX-AM (1969–1994, 2016–present)
KURS (1999–2003)
XEMO-AM (2004–2015)

See also
 List of current Major League Baseball announcers

San Diego Padres
 
Broadcasters
Prime Sports
Fox Sports Networks
Bally Sports